Pierre René Marie de Vaugiraud de Rosnay (Les Sables d'Olonne, 27 December 1741—Paris, 13 March 1819) was a French Navy officer. He served in the War of American Independence, earning membership in the Society of the Cincinnati. He was later a virulent Royalist and counter-Revolutionary.

Biography 
Vaugiraud was born to an aristocratic family. His brother, Marie Joseph Pierre de Vaugiraud, was bishop of Angers.

Vaugiraud joined the Navy as a Garde-Marine on 12 December 1755. In 1756, in the midst of the Seven Years' War, he served on the 64-gun Éveillé in the Caribbean, taking part in the capture of HMS Greenwich. He then transferred to the 74-gun Orient, on which he took part in the Battle of Quiberon Bay on 20 November 1759. He was promoted to Lieutenant on 1 October 1773. 

Vaugiraud served on Couronne during the Battle of Ushant on 27 July 1778. He briefly commanded the frigate Fox before transferring on Bretagne to serve as second major of Orvilliers' squadron. After his promotion to Captain on 4 April 1780, effective on 9 May 1781, he became Major-général of De Grasse's squadron, on the flagship Ville de Paris. As such, he took part in the Battle of Fort Royal on 30 April 1781 and in the Invasion of Tobago on 30 May. On 22 July 1781, while the French fleet was anchored at Cap-Haïtien, Intrépide caught fire, and Vaugiraud managed to have the ship sailed away, ran aground and evacuated before she exploded. Vaugiraud later took part in the Battle of the Chesapeake on 5 September, the subsequent Siege of Yorktown, the Battle of Saint Kitts on 25 January 1782, and was wounded at the Battle of the Saintes on 12 April 1782.

In 1785, he served on the frigate Railleuse, and was given command of Gracieuse in 1788.

In 1791, in the midst of the French Revolution, Vaugiraud fled France to become an émigré and join the reactionary Army of Condé. He took part in the Battle of Quibéron in 1795, and retired to England.

After the Bourbon Restauration, Vaugiraud was promoted to Vice-Admiral on 13 June 1814, and appointed Governor of the Windward Islands. He suppressed the Bonapartists during the Hundred Days, but was later recalled to Paris due to his authoritarian administration.

Sources and references 
 Notes

Citations

References
 
 
 
 

External links
 

French Navy officers
French military personnel of the American Revolutionary War